Edwin Flint (May 25, 1814October 15, 1891) was an American lawyer, Republican politician, and Wisconsin pioneer. He was one of the first settlers at La Crosse, Wisconsin, and represented the area in the Wisconsin State Senate for one year.  He also served as Wisconsin circuit court judge for the western part of Wisconsin from 1863 through 1868.

Biography

Born in Braintree, Vermont, Flint graduated from University of Vermont in 1836. He taught school in Virginia for one year and then went to Norwalk, Ohio, to read law. Flint was the tutor for the family of Isaac Shelby Governor of Kentucky. In 1840, Flint was admitted to the Indiana bar in Lafayette, Indiana. He then lived in Jackson, Michigan, in 1841. In 1848, Flint moved to Fond du Lac, Wisconsin, and practiced law. He moved to La Crosse, Wisconsin, in 1851 and continued to practiced law. He served as district attorney for La Crosse County, Wisconsin, in 1852. Flint also served on the La Crosse County Board of Supervisors and was the chairman of the county board. In 1862, Flint served in the Wisconsin State Senate. Then, in 1862, Flint was elected Wisconsin Circuit Court judge. In 1869, Flint moved to Mason City, Iowa, and practiced law until 1870 when he quit his law practice to manage his business affairs. Flint died in Mason City, Iowa.

References

External links
 

|-

1814 births
1891 deaths
People from Braintree, Vermont
People from Mason City, Iowa
Politicians from Jackson, Michigan
Politicians from La Crosse, Wisconsin
University of Vermont alumni
Indiana lawyers
Iowa lawyers
Wisconsin lawyers
County supervisors in Wisconsin
Wisconsin state court judges
Wisconsin state senators
19th-century American politicians
19th-century American judges
19th-century American lawyers